Hugh McIver VC MM & Bar (21 June 1890 – 2 September 1918) was a Scottish recipient of the Victoria Cross, the highest and most prestigious award for gallantry in the face of the enemy that can be awarded to British and Commonwealth forces.

He was 28 years old, and a private in the 2nd Battalion, The Royal Scots (The Lothian Regiment), British Army during the First World War when the following deed took place for which he was awarded the VC.

On 23 August 1918 east of Courcelle-le Compte, France, Private McIver was employed as a company-runner and under heavy artillery and machine-gun fire carried messages regardless of his own safety. Single-handed he pursued an enemy scout into a machine-gun post and having killed six of the garrison, captured 20 prisoners and two machine-guns. Later he succeeded, at great personal risk, in stopping the fire of a British tank which was directed in error against our own troops. He was killed in action 10 days later near Courcelles, France, on 2 September 1918.

His Victoria Cross is displayed at the Royal Scots Museum, Edinburgh Castle, Scotland.

In 2015, Kier Homes named a street in their Hawkhead Village development in Paisley, Hugh McIver Avenue, in memory of him.

References

Notes 
Monuments to Courage (David Harvey, 1999)
The Register of the Victoria Cross (This England, 1997)
Scotland's Forgotten Valour (Graham Ross, 1995)

1890 births
1918 deaths
British World War I recipients of the Victoria Cross
Royal Scots soldiers
British Army personnel of World War I
British military personnel killed in World War I
People from Renfrewshire
Recipients of the Military Medal
British Army recipients of the Victoria Cross
Military personnel from Renfrewshire